Sophie Elizabeth Smith (born 13 December 1986) is an Australian journalist, author, television reporter and presenter. She has lived and worked across Australia and the United Kingdom, reporting for major national and international mastheads, broadcasters and magazine titles. Smith is specialised in pro cycling and has covered nine Tours de France. She has filed on assignment from Asia, Europe, the Middle East and USA.

References

1986 births
Living people
Australian sports journalists
Australian television journalists
Australian television presenters
British journalists
British television presenters
British women television presenters
Cycling journalists
Journalists from Melbourne
Monash University alumni
Special Broadcasting Service
British women television journalists
Australian women television presenters